Leonard Tumilty (12 June 1884 – 27 March 1962) was an Australian cricketer. He played two first-class matches for Tasmania between 1911 and 1912.

See also
 List of Tasmanian representative cricketers

References

External links
 

1884 births
1962 deaths
Australian cricketers
Tasmania cricketers
Cricketers from Launceston, Tasmania